John Ikechukwu Okafor, (born 17 October 1961) popularly known as Mr. Ibu, is a Nigerian actor and comedian. Okafor is considered to be one of Nigeria's most talented and highly paid comic characters. His humorous acting is often characterized by stupidity, hilarious imbecility, and a sharp disconnection from reality.

Background and education 

He hails from Nkanu West L.G.A., Enugu State. After elementary school, in 1974, Okafor moved to Sapele to stay with his brother, after his father's demise. In Sapele, he did menial jobs so he could sponsor himself to school and support his family. He then worked as a hairstylist, ventured into photography and also worked in a company that produces crates. After secondary school, he was admitted into the College of Education, Yola, but pulled out due to financial difficulties. He later enrolled in the Institute of Management and Technology (IMT), Enugu as soon as he was financially able to.

Career 
He has acted in more than 200 NollyWood movies including Mr.Ibu (2004), Mr. Ibu and His Son, Coffin Producers, Husband Suppliers, International Players, Mr.Ibu in London (2004), Police Recruit (2003), 9 Wives (2005), Ibu in Prison (2006) and Keziah (2007).

See also
List of Nigerian actors

References

External links 

People from Enugu State
Living people
Nigerian male film actors
21st-century Nigerian male actors
1961 births
Actors from Enugu State
Igbo comedians
Nigerian comedians
Igbo actors